is a former Brazilian Japanese football player.

He moved to Japan at age 10 and obtained his Japanese citizenship in 2003. Although he is Brazilian Japanese and thus entitled to have his maternal surname Noguchi as his legal Japanese surname, he chose a combination of his paternal and maternal surnames as his legal Japanese surname.

Playing career
Noguchipinto was born in Rio de Janeiro on January 27, 1981. He joined J2 League club Oita Trinita in 2001. However he could not play at all in the match. In 2002, he moved to J2 club Sagan Tosu on loan due to restrictions on foreign players. On September 15, he debuted against his older club Trinita. In 2003, he returned to Trinita as a trainee. He obtained his Japanese citizenship in April 2003 and signed as a top team player. However he could not play at all in the match. In 2004, he moved to J1 League club Kashiwa Reysol. He played several matches in 3 seasons. In 2006, he moved to J2 club Avispa Fukuoka. However he could not play at all in the match. In 2008, he moved to Prefectural Leagues club Valiente Koriyama. In July 2008, he moved to Regional Leagues club AC Nagano Parceiro. He played as regular goalkeeper until 2009. In 2010, he moved to Thailand. His career winded down in Thailand, most notably for Samut Songkhram, then in the country's top flight. He retired end of 2014 season.

Club statistics

References

External links

1981 births
Living people
Japanese footballers
Brazilian footballers
J1 League players
J2 League players
Erikson Noguchipinto
Erikson Noguchipinto
Oita Trinita players
Sagan Tosu players
Kashiwa Reysol players
Avispa Fukuoka players
AC Nagano Parceiro players
Erikson Noguchipinto
Erikson Noguchipinto
Erikson Noguchipinto
Japanese expatriate footballers
Japanese expatriate sportspeople in Thailand
Expatriate footballers in Thailand
Association football goalkeepers
Brazilian emigrants to Japan
Naturalized citizens of Japan
Footballers from Rio de Janeiro (city)